Book of Equanimity or Book of Serenity or Book of Composure (Chinese: 從容錄, Cóngróng lù; Japanese: 従容錄, Shōyōroku) is a book compiled by Wansong Xingxiu (1166–1246), and first published in 1224.  The book comprises a collection of 100 koans written by the Chan Buddhist master Hongzhi Zhengjue (1091–1157), together with commentaries by Wansong.  Wansong's compilation is the only surviving source for Hongzhi's koans.

Along with The Gateless Barrier, the Book of Equanimity is considered one of the two primary compilations of Zen dialogue. Shohaku Okumura has called the collection "a classic text that is still studied by Zen students today." Reb Anderson has called it "an auspicious peak in the mountain range of Zen literature, a subtle flowing stream in the deep valleys of our teaching, a treasure house of inspiration and guidance in studying the ocean of Buddhist teachings." Gerry Shishin Wick, who published a translation of Book of Equanimity in 2005, says "although it was collected by a master in the Soto lineage, The Book of Equanimity, they are treated as Koans in the Rinzai, some Rinzai schools, and the Soto school studied them, but more as liturgy, rather than as Koans."

Kōans included in Book of Equanimity

1 The World-Honored One Ascends the Rostrum
2 Bodhidharma's "Vast and Void"
3 The Indian King Invites the Patriarch
4 The World-Honored One Points to the Ground
5 Seigen's "Price of Rice"
6 Master Ba's "White and Black"
7 Yakusan Ascends the Rostrum
8 Hyakujô and the Fox
9 Nansen Kills a Cat
10 An Old Woman near Taizan
11 Unmon's "Two Diseases"
12 Jizô Plants the Rice Field
13 Rinzai's "Blind Donkey"
14 Attendant Kaku Offers Tea
15 Kyôzan Thrusts His Hoe into the Ground
16 Mayoku Shook the Ring-Staff
17 Hôgen's "Hairsbreadth"
18 Jôshû's Dog 
19 Unmon's "Mt. Sumeru"
20 Jizô's "Most Intimate"
21 Ungan Sweeps the Ground
22 Gantô's Bow to the Kaatz
23 Roso Faces the Wall
24 Seppô's "Look at the Snake"
25 Enkan's "Rhinoceros Fan"

26 Kyôzan Points to Snow
27 Hôgen Points to the Bamboo Blinds
28 Gokoku's "Three Disgraces"
29 Fuketsu's "Iron Ox"
30 Daizui's "Kalpa Fire"
31 Unmon's "Pillar"
32 Kyôzan's Mind and Objective World
33 Sanshô's "Golden Scales"
34 Fuketsu's "Speck of Dust"
35 Rakuho's Obeisance
36 Master Ba Is Ill
37 Isan's "Karma-Consciousness"
38 Rinzai's "True Person"
39 Jôshû's "Wash Your Bowls"
40 Unmon's "White and Black"
41 Rakuho at His Deathbed
42 Nan'yô and the Water Jug
43 Razan's "Appearing and Disappearing"
44 Kôyô's "Suparnin"
45 Four Phrases from the Engaku Sutra
46 Tokusan's "Study Accomplished"
47 Jôshû's "Oak Tree in the Garden"
48 Vimalakirti's "Not-Two"
49 Tôzan and the Memorial Service
50 Seppô's "What Is This?"

51 Hôgen's "Boat or Land"
52 Sôzan's "Dharma-body"
53 Ôbaku's "Drinkers"
54 Ungan's "Great Mercy"
55 Seppô in Charge of Cooking
56 Misshi and the White Rabbit
57 Gon'yô's One "Thing"
58 "Getting Despised" in the Diamond Sutra 
59 Seirin's "Deadly Snake"
60 Tetsuma, the Cow
61 Kempô's "One Line"
62 Beiko's "Enlightenment"
64 Shishô's "Succession"
63 Jôshû Asks about "Death"
65 Shuzan's "Bride"
66 Kyûhô's "Head and Tail"
67 The Wisdom in the Kegon Sutra
68 Kassan Brandishes the Sword
69 Nansen's "Cats and Foxes"
70 Shinsan Asks about Nature
71 Suigan's "Eyebrows"
72 Chûyû's "Monkey"
73 Sôzan's Filial Fulfillment
74 Hôgen's "Form and Name"
75 Zuigan's "Everlasting Principle"

76 Shuzan's Three Verses
77 Kyôzan: As His Profession Requires
78 Unmon's "Rice Cake"
79 Chôsa Takes a Step
80 Suibi and the Chin Rest
81 Gensha Reaches the Province
82 Unmon's: "Voice" and "Color"
83 Dôgo's Nursing the Ill
84 Gutei's One Finger
85 The National Teacher's Gravestone
86 Rinzai's Great Enlightenment
87 Sozan: With or Without
88 "Non-Seeing" in the Ryôgon Sutra
89 Tôzan's "Place of No Grass"
90 Kyôzan Speaks Out
91 Nansen and the Peonies
92 Unmon's "One Treasure"
93 Roso Does Not Understand
94 Tôzan Unwell
95 Rinzai Draws a Line
96 Kyûhô Does Not Acknowledge
97 Emperor Dôkô's Helmet Hood
98 Tôzan's "Intimate with It"
99 Unmon's "Bowl and Pail"
100 Rôya's "Mountains and Rivers"

Translations

See also
101 Zen Stories
The Gateless Gate
Blue Cliff Record

References

External links
Shōyōroku (Book of Equanimity)
Poems reflecting the Book of Equanimity
Dharma Talks by Shugen Sensei on the Book of Equanimity
Dharma Talks by Yamada Koun Roshi on the Book of Equanimity
The text in Chinese (copy at the Internet Archive)

Zen koan collections